Botrytis is a genus of anamorphic fungi in the family Sclerotiniaceae. Botrytis (also known as grey mold) belongs to the group hyphomycetes and has about 30 different species. It is a plant parasite as well as saprophytes on both agricultural and forest trees. It produces stout, dark, branching conidiophores that bear clusters of paler conidia (grey in mass) on denticles from apical ampullae. It is a common outdoor fungus and can be detected in spore trap samples. The fungus is often found growing on indoor plants. Although no mycotoxin has been reported from this fungus, it may cause hay fever, asthma and keratomycosis. The most common species is B. cinerea, which is a plant pathogen causing gray mould on a very broad range of hosts including some common ornamental plants, such as geranium, begonia, rose, lily, dogwood, rhododendron, dahlia, magnolia, camellia  and fruits and produce. This fungus is mainly of outdoor origin, although it may be from growth on fruits or flowers brought in from outdoors. Some houseplants can be infected by this fungus, such as cyclamen, poinsettia, chrysanthemum, and gerbera. Other species of Botrytis may be present, such as B. peoniae on peonies, B. squamosa on onion, and B. tulipae on tulips. These species of Botrytis share some common characteristics in pathology and ecology.

The generic name Botrytis is derived from the Greek bótrys ("cluster of", "grapes") and the Latin suffix -itis ("like").

Species

Botrytis aclada
Botrytis allii
Botrytis allii-fistulosi
Botrytis ampelophila
Botrytis anacardii
Botrytis anthophila
Botrytis argillacea
Botrytis arisaemae
Botrytis artocarpi
Botrytis bifurcata
Botrytis bryi
Botrytis capsularum
Botrytis carnea
Botrytis caroliniana
Botrytis carthami
Botrytis cercosporaecola
Botrytis cercosporicola
Botrytis cinerea
Botrytis citricola
Botrytis citrina
Botrytis convallariae
Botrytis croci
Botrytis cryptomeriae
Botrytis densa
Botrytis diospyri
Botrytis elliptica
Botrytis fabae
Botrytis fabiopsis
Botrytis galanthina
Botrytis gladioli
Botrytis gossypina
Botrytis hormini
Botrytis hyacinthi
Botrytis isabellina
Botrytis latebricola
Botrytis liliorum
Botrytis limacidae
Botrytis luteobrunnea
Botrytis lutescens
Botrytis mali
Botrytis monilioides
Botrytis necans
Botrytis paeoniae
Botrytis peronosporoides
Botrytis pistiae
Botrytis platensis
Botrytis pruinosa
Botrytis pseudocinerea
Botrytis pyramidalis
Botrytis rivoltae
Botrytis rosea
Botrytis rubescens
Botrytis rudiculoides
Botrytis sekimotoi
Botrytis septospora
Botrytis setuligera
Botrytis sinoallii
Botrytis sonchina
Botrytis splendida
Botrytis squamosa
Botrytis taxi
Botrytis terrestris
Botrytis tracheiphila
Botrytis trifolii
Botrytis tulipae
Botrytis viciae-hirsutae
Botrytis yuae

Conidia 
Conidia colorless, gray to pale brown, smooth, ellipsoidal, obovoid, or subspherical, mostly nonseptate.   With the presence of a conidiophore, it is not difficult to identify this genus. However, it is a quite challenging to identify its conidia in the samples of spore count. Conidia of this genus are often described as unidentified fungal spores.

Conidiophore 
Conidiophores gray to brown, straight or flexuous, smooth, branched, often dichotomously or trichotomously, with branch ends often enlarged. A conidiophore forms a long stipe and a dense head.

References

External links

Helotiales genera
Sclerotiniaceae
Taxa described in 1794